The Battle of Bellevue on 7 October 1870 was fought during the Franco-Prussian War and ended in a Prussian victory.

The French forces under Marshal François Achille Bazaine attempted to break through the lines of the Prussians investing Metz. They were unsuccessful and were driven back into the city with a loss of 1,257 soldiers and 64 officers. The Prussians lost 1,703 soldiers and 75 officers.

References
George Bruce. Harbottle's Dictionary of Battles. (Van Nostrand Reinhold, 1981).

1870 in France
Conflicts in 1870
Battles involving France
Battles of the Franco-Prussian War
Battles involving Prussia
Bellevue
History of Moselle (department)
October 1870 events